Jacques Gauthier (born October 17, 1998) is a Canadian curler from Winnipeg, Manitoba. He currently skips his own team out of Victoria, British Columbia.

Career
Gauthier played most of his junior career as third for J. T. Ryan. With Ryan, he won a silver medal at the 2019 Canadian Junior Curling Championships and a bronze medal at the 2018 Canadian Junior Curling Championships. In 2018, he got to play in his first World Junior Curling Championships as alternate for Tyler Tardi. The team won a gold medal. Ryan aged out of juniors after the 2019 championships and Gauthier formed his own team for the 2019–20 season. His rink of Jordan Peters, Brayden Payette and Zack Bilawka lost the final of the 2020 Manitoba Junior Provincials. They still got to go to the 2020 Canadian Junior Curling Championships, representing the second Manitoba team as Nunavut and Yukon did not send teams. The team finished the round robin and championship pool with a 9–1 record which qualified them for the final. The team curled 92% which led them to a 8–6 victory over Newfoundland and Labrador's Daniel Bruce. At the 2020 World Junior Curling Championships, the team finished the round robin in second with a 7–2 record. In the playoffs, they defeated Germany in the semifinal and Switzerland in the final to claim the gold medal.

Personal life
Gauthier currently lives in Winnipeg and was a finance student at the University of Manitoba. He currently works as a financial analyst with BDO Canada LLP. He is in a relationship with fellow curler Karlee Burgess. His cousin Tyler Tardi is a three-time Canadian Junior Curling Champion. His mother Cathy is a three-time Tournament of Hearts champion and curling broadcaster.

Teams

References

External links

1998 births
Living people
Canadian male curlers
Curlers from Winnipeg
University of Manitoba alumni